PWTC LRT station is a light rail transit (LRT) station in Kuala Lumpur that is served by the Ampang Line and Sri Petaling Line. PWTC stands for "Putra World Trade Center", which was the former name of the World Trade Centre Kuala Lumpur. The World Trade Centre Kuala Lumpur is a convention and exhibition centre in Kuala Lumpur, Malaysia.

The station is located within Kuala Lumpur's Golden Triangle region and is only a 45-minute from the Kuala Lumpur International Airport (KLIA). It is within walking distance of a mall, restaurants, entertainment centres and 3 - 5 star hotels, many of which are connected by elevated walkways to the station itself. The Sunway Putra Mall is located right next to the station.

Additionally, for about a 400-metre walk from the station, there is the  Putra station served by the Seremban Line and Port Klang Line.

History
The station was opened in the middle of 1998, as part of the second phase of the STAR system's opening. For the second phase, it consists of a 12 km extension from Chan Sow Lin LRT station in Kuala Lumpur to Sri Petaling and a 3 km extension from Sultan Ismail to Sentul Timur. Under Phase 2, a 15 km track with 11 stations was built to serve the northern and southern areas of Kuala Lumpur to cater for the Commonwealth Village and National Sports Complex in Bukit Jalil, during the KL Commonwealth Games in 1998.

Places of interest
World Trade Centre Kuala Lumpur
Sunway Putra Mall Shopping Centre and Sunway Putra Hotel
Dynasty Hotel Kuala Lumpur

References

Ampang Line